Cyrtodactylus wakeorum is a species of bent-toed gecko, a lizard in the family Gekkonidae. The species is endemic to Myanmar.

Etymology
The specific name, wakeorum (genitive plural), is in honor of American herpetologists David Burton Wake and Marvalee Hendricks Wake, husband and wife.

Taxonomy
C. wakeorum was discovered in 2001 in Myanmar's Rakhine Yoma Elephant Range and described in 2003.

Habitat
The preferred natural habitat of C. wakeorum is forest.

Description

Reproduction
C. wakeorum is oviparous.

References

Cyrtodactylus
Reptiles of Myanmar
Endemic fauna of Myanmar
Reptiles described in 2003
Taxa named by Aaron M. Bauer